Bogdan IV of Moldavia (9 May 1555 – July 1574) was Prince of Moldavia from 1568 to 1572. He succeeded to the throne as son of the previous ruler, Alexandru Lăpușneanu.

Rulers of Moldavia
16th-century monarchs in Europe
House of Bogdan-Mușat